Nándor Gelénesi (born 7 February 1973) is a Hungarian wrestler. He competed in the men's Greco-Roman 90 kg at the 1996 Summer Olympics.

References

1973 births
Living people
Hungarian male sport wrestlers
Olympic wrestlers of Hungary
Wrestlers at the 1996 Summer Olympics
Sportspeople from Győr